The Bentonville Confederate Monument was installed in Bentonville, Arkansas, United States. It was removed in September 2020.

Description and history
Placed in the center of Square Park, the  granite statue of a Confederate soldier standing at parade rest was placed by the United Daughters of the Confederacy in 1908. A later plaque honors James Henderson Berry, a Confederate soldier with the 16th Arkansas Infantry Regiment who would later become the first Arkansas Governor from Benton County. The inscription reads "They Fought For Home and Fatherland. Their Names are Borne On Honors Shield. Their Record Is With God.". 

The statue was manufactured in Barre, Vermont.

Although the park was deeded to the United Daughters of the Confederacy for use as a park in perpetuity, the chapter had disbanded prior to 1996. Benton County took control of the park, and allowed the City of Bentonville to take over care and maintenance.

The monument was added to the National Register of Historic Places (NRHP) in 1996.

In September 2020, after years of controversy over confederate monuments nationwide, the monument was removed from the Bentonville Square. 

In February 2022, the Bentonville city planning commission announced a plan for the statue to be placed at a new park. The park, named after James Berry will feature the Statue and original base as the centerpiece, with the park located next to the Bentonville Cemetery.

Inscriptions 

North face:

East face:

South face:

West face:

Metal plate added to west face on January 30, 1914:

See also

 1908 in art
 Downtown Bentonville
 List of Confederate monuments and memorials 
 List of monuments and memorials removed during the George Floyd protests
 National Register of Historic Places listings in Benton County, Arkansas

References

External links

1908 establishments in Arkansas
1908 sculptures
Monuments and memorials in the United States removed during the George Floyd protests
Confederate States of America monuments and memorials in Arkansas
Outdoor sculptures in Arkansas
Sculptures of men in Arkansas
Statues in Arkansas
Statues removed in 2020
National Register of Historic Places in Bentonville, Arkansas